Alan Douglas Rose  (born 3 May 1944) is a former senior Australian public servant. He was Secretary of the Attorney-General's Department between 1989 and 1994.

Life and career
Alan Rose was born in Brisbane on 3 May 1944. He was educated at state schools: Rainworth Primary School; and Indooroopilly High School. He later attended the University of Queensland, where he earned a BA in 1966 and an LLB(Hons) in 1969, and the London School of Economics, where he earned an LLM in 1979.

From 1986 to 1987, Rose was Secretary of the Department of Community Services. In the 1987 public service restructure, when all Australian Government departments were reorganised into 16 'super-ministries', Rose was named Associate Secretary of the Attorney-General's Department. He was promoted to become the Department's Secretary in 1989. 

In May 1994, Rose left his Secretary role and was appointed President of the Australian Law Reform Commission.

Rose joined law firm HWL Ebsworth as a consultant in 2011. The same year, he was also appointed Chair of the Defence Honours and Awards Tribunal.

Awards
Rose was made an Officer of the Order of Australia in January 1994 for service to public administration, particularly through service to the Attorney-General's Department.

Notes

References

1944 births
Living people
Alumni of the London School of Economics
Australian public servants
Officers of the Order of Australia
People from Brisbane